Aloysius John "Johnny" Jordan (birth registered first ¼ 1906 – death registered third ¼ 1957) was an English professional rugby league footballer who played in the 1930s. He played at club level for York.

Background
Johnny Jordan's birth was registered in York district, Yorkshire, he was the landlord of the Spread Eagle pub at 98 Walmgate, York, he was working for Rowntree's in York when he suffered a stroke that killed him, and his death aged 51 was registered in York district, Yorkshire.

It was reported in The Press on 13 July 2013 that Johnny Jordan's 1930–31 Challenge Cup runner-up medal had been misplaced when his wife Elizabeth (née Johnson) had taken the medal to The Blue Bell pub, 53 Fossgate, York, following Johnny Jordan's death in 1957.

Club career
Johnny Jordan made his début for York on Saturday 25 October 1930, in York's progress to the 1930–31 Challenge Cup Final during the 1930–31 season, he scored tries in the second-round match against Huddersfield, third-round match against Salford, and the semi-final match against Warrington, a strain prevented him appearing in the 8-22 defeat by Halifax Final at Wembley Stadium, London on Saturday 2 May 1931, however he was awarded a runner-up medal, his last game for York was on Wednesday 14 March 1934.

Genealogical information
Johnny Jordan's marriage to Elizabeth Johnson was registered during third ¼ 1928 in York district.

Note
According to the FreeBMD, Johnny Jordan's forename is registered as 'Aloysious', i.e. with an 'o', on the birth, and death indexes, but as 'Aloysius', i.e. without an 'o', on the marriage index.

References

External links
Search for "Jordan" at rugbyleagueproject.org

1906 births
1957 deaths
Rugby league players from York
York Wasps players